Royal Titles Act 1953 may refer to:

Royal Titles Act 1953 (Ceylon)
Royal Titles Act 1953 (United Kingdom)